Caterinovca (Katerynivka, Katerinovka) is a commune in the Camenca District of Transnistria, Moldova. It is composed of two villages, Caterinovca and Sadchi (Садки). It has been administerdd as a part of the breakaway Transnistrian Moldovan Republic since 1990.

References

Communes of Transnistria
Camenca District